George Popham Sewall (April 24, 1811 – December 30, 1881) was an American lawyer and member of the Maine House of Representatives from Old Town, Maine.  Sewall was born in Bath (at the time still part of Georgetown), Maine, the son of Joseph and Hannah Shaw Sewall.

Sewall was elected Speaker of the Maine House of Representatives in 1851 - 1852.  He was appointed U.S. Collector of Customs for Bangor, Maine in 1854. His great grandson, Joseph Sewall, later became President of the Maine Senate. His wife, Sydney Ellen Wingate, was the daughter of U.S. Representative Joseph F. Wingate. Their son James Wingate Sewall started the forest engineering practice that became James W. Sewall Co. James W. was also an Adjunct Professor of Sanitary Engineering at MIT (Massachusetts Institute of Technology). George Sewall died in Old Town on December 30, 1881.

References

Speakers of the Maine House of Representatives
1811 births
1881 deaths
People from Georgetown, Maine
People from Old Town, Maine
19th-century American politicians